Shadow Project is the debut of alt-rock/goth metal band Shadow Project, released in 1991 by Triple X Records.

Critical reception 
AllMusic described Shadow Project's debut as a unique and adventurous "blend of goth, punk and glam", a challenging record that would ultimately prove satisfying after several spins.

Track listing

Credits 
Shadow Project
 Rozz Williams – vocals
 Eva O – guitar
 Jill Emery – bass
 Thomas Morgan – drums
 Paris – keyboards

Production
 Shadow Project – production, design
 Greg Brown – producer, engineer
 Craig Nepp – producer, engineer
 Arte DeLeon – photography
 Dino Paredes – design

References 

Shadow Project albums
1991 debut albums
Triple X Records albums